Hajji Kandi (also Romanized as Ḩājjī Kandī and Ḩājī Kandī; also known as Khadzhi-Kendi) is a village in Zanjanrud-e Bala Rural District, in the Central District of Zanjan County, Zanjan Province, Iran. At the 2006 census, its population was 122, in 34 families.

References 

Populated places in Zanjan County